Ben Ward (born 2 December 1974) is a British musician who has been the singer of Orange Goblin since 1997.

Ward had wanted to become a footballer for Queens Park Rangers, but, inspired by Lemmy and Bruce Dickinson, “discovered heavy metal, booze and drugs, so football fell by the wayside”. Ward helped found Our Haunted Kingdom in 1994 and they evolved into Orange Goblin in 1997. He has been their singer ever since, recording nine studio albums with the band.

Between 2007 and 2010, Ward was a member of Ravens Creed. He sang on one of their albums.

In 2016 Ward set up a Just Giving campaign for 73 Team Rock employees, whom he thought were being unfairly treated by being threatened with redundancy. Ward is also the founder of Route One Booking Agency.

References 

1974 births
British rock singers
British heavy metal singers
musicians from Newcastle upon Tyne
20th-century British male singers
Singers from London
21st-century British male singers
Living people